Golda is a term of which the various forms stem from Proto-Germanic gulþą "gold", and may refer to:

Geography
 Golda, the original name of Gouda, South Holland, Netherlands
 Golda, the earliest known name for the river Gouwe in the Netherlands
 Ramat Golda neighborhood in Haifa, Israel 
 Sderot Golda Meir (Route 436 (Israel–Palestine)), regional arterial road in Israel and the West Bank

People
Notable people with this name include:
 Mascha Kaléko (1907–1975), born Gołda Małka Aufen, German-language poet
 Olga Bancic (1912–1944), born Golda Bancic, Jewish Romanian communist and member of the French Resistance during World War II
 Golda Fried (born 1972), novelist, writer, and poet
 Golda Friedman, character from Berlin Station (TV series)
 Golda Gorbman (1887–1959), spouse of Kliment Voroshilov
 Golda Glickman, better known as Roxana Sand or Roxanne Carmine, erotic dancer and fan dancer
 Abigail Golda Hoffman (born 1947), Canadian track and field athlete
 Lea Golda Holterman (born 1976), Israeli photographer
 Golda Krolik (1892–1985), Detroit activist and organizer
 Golda Lishansky, better known as Rachel Yanait Ben-Zvi (1886–1979), Israeli author and educator, and a leading Labor Zionist
 Golda Madden (1886–1960), American actress
 Golda Marcus (born 1983), swimmer from El Salvador
 Golda Meir (1898–1978), fourth Prime Minister of Israel
 Golda Rosheuvel (born 1970), Guyanese-British actress and singer
 Mary Golda Ross (1908–2008), Native American female engineer
 Golda Selzer (1910–1999), academic and pathologist at Groote Schuur Hospital, and co-founder of SHAWCO
 Golda Schultz (born 1983), South African operatic soprano
 Gołda Stawarowska from Warsaw Ghetto boy photography
 Gołda Tencer (born 1949), Polish actress and singer

 Ireneusz Golda (born 1955), Polish athlete
 Natalie Golda (born 1981), Olympic water polo player

Other
 Golda (film), starring Helen Mirren as Golda Meir (in production as at April 2021)
 A Woman Called Golda, 1982 American film, starring Ingrid Bergman as Golda Meir
 Golda's Balcony, play by William Gibson
 Golda's Balcony, 2019 American film 
 Bust of Golda Meir, outdoor bronze sculpture in New York City
 Goldaş, Turkish jewellery fabricator
 golda chingri, Bangladesh and India for Macrobrachium rosenbergii

See also
 Gilda
 Goldie (disambiguation)
 Goldy (disambiguation)

Jewish feminine given names
Hebrew feminine given names